"Shortnin' Bread" (also spelled "Shortenin' Bread", "Short'nin' Bread", or "Sho'tnin' Bread") is an African-American folk song dating back at least to the 1890s. James Whitcomb Riley published it as a poem in 1900, building on older lyrics.  A "collected" version of the song was published by E. C. Perrow in 1915. It is song number 4209 in the Roud Folk Song Index.

Shortening bread refers to a bread made of corn meal and/or flour and lard shortening.

Origins
"Shortnin' Bread" is a plantation song. Its first written version was captured by poet James Whitcomb Riley in 1900. He titled the song "A Short'nin' Bread Song—Pieced Out", and wrote the first verse as:

The dialect rendered into common English would be:

The verse includes:

Another pair of verses may be later, and exist in several versions:

(In some versions there are two children instead of three - and the "other" either "bump'd his head" or "was dead". Neither of these quite scan. The children (or "chillun") were once referred to by one of several racist terms.

Other verses include:

Reese DuPree composed a version recorded in 1927.

Folk version
Titled "Shortened Bread", E. C. Perrow published the first folk version of this song in 1915, which he collected from East Tennessee in 1912. The folk version of the song—as with Riley's—does not have any distinct theme, but consists of various floating lyrics, some relating to "shortnin' bread", some not. The traditional chorus associated with the folk song goes:

The Beach Boys version

Background

"Shortenin' Bread" was recorded by the American rock band the Beach Boys numerous times. Only one version has seen official release, as the final track on their 1979 album L.A. (Light Album).

The band's principal songwriter Brian Wilson was reportedly obsessed with the song, having recorded more than a dozen versions of the tune. Beach Boy Al Jardine speculated that Wilson's obsession with the song may have begun after co-writing the song "Ding Dang" with the Byrds' Roger McGuinn in the early 1970s.

Numerous anecdotes have been reported about Wilson's obsession with the song:
 Alex Chilton, the former lead singer of Big Star, recalled receiving middle-of-the-night phone calls from Wilson asking him to sing on a recording of "Shortenin' Bread"' ("He was telling me I have the perfect voice for it").
 The Monkees' Micky Dolenz said that when he tripped on LSD with Wilson, John Lennon, and Nilsson, Wilson played "Shortenin' Bread" on piano "over and over again".
 Biographer Peter Ames Carlin wrote that Elton John and Iggy Pop were bemused by an extended, contumacious Wilson-led singalong of "Shortenin' Bread", leading Pop to flee the room proclaiming, "I gotta get out of here, man. This guy is nuts!"
 Musician Alice Cooper recalled that Wilson considered "Shortnin' Bread" to be the greatest song ever written. According to Cooper, when he asked why, Wilson responded "I don't know, it's just the best song ever written." 

A number of Wilson-produced "Shortenin' Bread" and "Ding Dang" variations remain unreleased. Titles include "Clangin'" (recorded with Harry Nilsson), "Brian's Jam", and "Rolling Up to Heaven". A version that was developed from a 1973 session, featuring American Spring as guest vocalists, was completed for the unreleased album Adult/Child in 1977.

Personnel
Credits per Craig Slowinski, sourced from his L.A. (Light Album) sessionography.

The Beach Boys
Al Jardine - backing vocals
Bruce Johnston - backing vocals, Fender Rhodes
Mike Love - backing vocals
Brian Wilson - piano, Moog synthesizer
Carl Wilson - lead and backing vocals; possible guitar
Dennis Wilson - bass vocal, drums

Additional musicians

Michael Andreas - saxophone
Joe Chemay - additional bass guitar
Bernard Fleischer - saxophone
Jim Guercio - bass guitar
Billy Hinsche - guitars
Chuck Kirkpatrick - guitar
Jimmy Lyon - lead guitar
Rod Novak - saxophone
Fred Selden - saxophone
Sterling Smith - Hammond organ

Other renditions

 The Andrews Sisters
 Al Jolson
 Gid Tanner
 The Viscounts
 Sonny Terry, Sonny Terry's New Sound: The Jawharp in Blues and Folk Music (1968)
 Lawrence Tibbett
 Fats Waller
 Dave Brubeck
 Frances Faye
 Taj Mahal (musician)
 Richard White
 1937 – Nelson Eddy, Maytime
 1956 - Etta James, Etta "Miss Peaches" James: Shortnin' Bread Rock / Tears of Joy
 1963 – Mississippi John Hurt, D.C. Blues: Library of Congress Recordings
 1966 – Lee Dorsey
 1982 – Klaus Flouride
 1981 – The Kelly Family, Wonderful World!
 1990 – The Cramps, Stay Sick
 1998 – The Tractors, Farmers in a Changing World (reached No. 57 on the Hot Country Songs chart), Heaven's Sake Kids
 2002 – Laurie Berkner, Under a Shady Tree
 2014 and 2017 – The Wiggles

In popular culture

Music
 The Unity Church sings "Every little cell in my body is healthy. Every little cell in my body is well." to the tune of "Shortnin' Bread". It appears in all three editions of the hymnal and was reportedly used by Myrtle Fillmore during her healing. 
 The tune for a significant portion of "The Happy Organ" (1959) bears a strong resemblance to the "Shortnin' Bread" tune (the portion under "put on the skillet, slip on the lid, mammy's gonna make us some shortnin' bread").
 “Bread and Butter” by The Newbeats (1964) is also based on the "put on the skillet" melody. “I Can't Believe What You Say (for Seeing What You Do)” by Ike Turner (1964) shares this progression.
 The melody from the "put on the skillet" portion also forms the harmonic choruses of "Little Bitty Pretty One" by Thurston Harris and the Sharps (1957), "The Tra La La Song (One Banana, Two Banana)" by The Banana Splits (1968), and "Buffalo Soldier" by Bob Marley and the Wailers (1983).
 In the Elvis Presley song "Clambake", "Shortnin' Bread" is paraphrased as "Mama's little baby loves clambake clambake, mama's little baby loves clambake too."
 Paul Chaplain and his Emeralds took a rock version of the song to No. 82 in the Hot 100 in August 1962.
 The chorus to the song is used as a melody in the song "Pachuco Cadaver" on Trout Mask Replica by Captain Beefheart and His Magic Band.
 The 1994 song "Deuces Are Wild" by Aerosmith features the line "Mama's little baby loves shortnin' bread" in the lyrics.
Hap Palmer wrote a song "Sittin' in a High Chair" for his 1984 album BabySong while using the music to adapt it. A video for the song shows a mama orangutan feeding her baby.
Johnny Cash mentioned the line "Mama's little baby loves shortnin' bread" in the Mark O'Connor song "The Devil Comes Back to Georgia", a continuation of "The Devil Went Down to Georgia" and a collaboration with Marty Stuart, Travis Tritt, and Charlie Daniels.

Film
 Willie the Whale sings the first verse and the chorus of the song in the animated short "The Whale Who Wanted to Sing at the Met" featured in the Disney film Make Mine Music (1946).
 Donald Duck sings the song while making pancakes in the animated short Three for Breakfast (1948) and you can hear him sing a short version of this in Lion Around (1950).
 In the Looney Tunes cartoon Swooner Crooner (1944), the first of many crooning roosters who audition for Porky Pig is a caricature of Vaughn Monroe who sings the refrain.
 In the Merrie Melodies cartoon Hare Tonic (1945), Elmer Fudd sings the song at the beginning of the cartoon but with the lyrics changed from "shortnin' bread" into "wabbit stew".
 Nelson Eddy, as Willie the Operatic Whale, sings in the Disney animated feature Make Mine Music (1946).
 Rosa Rio played the song in her original Video Yesteryear score for The Wizard of Oz (1925) in the mid-1980s as a theme for the character of Snowball (Spencer Bell, credited as G. Howe Black). Some reviewers found this reinforced the racist portrayal of the character. 
 In the film Police Academy 4 (1987), the character Captain Harris is seen singing the song into his cane.
 Similarities have been noted in the main theme for Driving Miss Daisy (1989).
 In the movie Trainspotting (1996), Renton's friends and family sing the song in a celebration after he avoids being jailed.
 At the end of the credits in the movie Secret Window (2004), Johnny Depp is heard singing the song.
 Chris Rock sings this at a funeral in the comedy Death at a Funeral (2010).
 Rod Steiger sings a modified version, "Mama's little Joy Boy loves lobster, lobster" in the black comedy The Loved One (1965), when describing a nightmare he had involving his mother and lobsters.

Television
 In the I Love Lucy episode "Ethel's Home Town" (1955), Ethel sings "Shortnin' Bread" while Lucy, Ricky, and Fred perform a comedy routine behind her.
 The Bullwinkle Show (1959-1964): Numerous characters sing this song in different contexts. In one Dudley Do-Right segment, "The Masked Ginny Lynne", Dudley begins leaping around and dancing while singing this song, as the opera singer renders everyone else inert with her soporific moan. One Fractured Fairy Tales retelling of "The Three Little Pigs" begins with three pig sisters receiving a singing telegram, to the tune of this song, telling them they have inherited a fortune.
 The Banana Splits (1969): The "Tra La La" theme song uses a chorus derived from "Shortnin' Bread".
 In 1984, the children's music trio Sharon, Lois & Bram performed this song in Season 1 of their hit TV show Sharon, Lois & Bram's Elephant Show.
 In the 1985 Kidsongs video, "A Day at Old MacDonald's Farm", "Shortnin' Bread" is sung in a different way pertaining to eating breakfast.
 In the Batman: The Animated Series episode "Harley and Ivy", Harley Quinn hums the refrain in one scene while setting a table. 
 In the Ren & Stimpy episode, "I Love Chicken", Ren Höek sings the song whilst preparing a meal.
 At the end of a The Fresh Prince of Bel-Air episode, Will is seen singing the song while scrubbing the floor with his cousin as the end credits roll.
 In the Tom & Jerry cartoon, "The Milky Waif" (1946), the tune of "Shortnin' Bread" is played when Jerry and Nibbles daub themselves with shoe polish and appear in blackface to confuse Tom.
 In the Warner Bros. animated television series Animaniacs, this song is part of the regular soundtrack for the adventures of Yakko, Wakko, and Dot, and is played over and over again throughout the series.
 In the episode "Terms of Endearment" on the adult comedy show Drawn Together, the character Foxxy Love sings a few verses of the refrain.

References

Bibliography
 
 
Eitel, Edmund Henry (ed.) The Complete Works of James Whitcomb Riley, Vol 5. Indianapolis: The Bobbs-Merrill Company (1913).
 
 
Perrow, E.C. "Songs and Rhymes from the South." The Journal of American Folklore, 28:108 (April - Jun. 1915) 129–190.
 Wade, Stephen. The Beautiful Music all Around Us: Field Recordings and the American Experience. Urbana: University of Illinois Press, 2012.
Waltz, Robert B; David G. Engle. "Shortenin' Bread". The Traditional Ballad Index: An Annotated Bibliography of the Folk Songs of the English-Speaking World. Hosted by California State University, Fresno, Folklore, 2007.

External links
 The Complete Works of James Whitcomb Riley: In Ten Volumes, Including Poems and Prose Sketches, Many of which Have Not Heretofore Been Published; an Authentic Biography, an Elaborate Index and Numerous Illustrations in Color from Paintings by Howard Chandler Christy and Ethel Franklin Betts – complete text of James Whitcomb Riley's "A Short'nin' Bread Song—Pieced Out".
A traditional version of lyrics and an MP3 clip are here Shortenin' Bread • Lyrics & Song Clip (free mp3).

American folk songs
James Whitcomb Riley
The Tractors songs
Mississippi John Hurt songs
1900 songs
American children's songs
The Beach Boys songs
Brian Wilson
The Beach Boys bootleg recordings